is a retired Japanese football player who last played for Blaublitz Akita.

Career
Taiki Nakashima joined J1 League club; Sagan Tosu in 2015. March 18, he debuted in J.League Cup (v Matsumoto Yamaga FC).

He joined Blaublitz Akita for the 2019 season. The transfer was confirmed on 15 December 2018.

Club statistics
Updated to 22 February 2020.

References

External links

Profile at Kamatamare Sanuki

1995 births
Living people
Fukuoka University alumni
Association football people from Saga Prefecture
Japanese footballers
J1 League players
J2 League players
J3 League players
Sagan Tosu players
Kamatamare Sanuki players
Blaublitz Akita players
Association football defenders